The 1948 United States presidential election in Oklahoma took place on November 2, 1948. All forty-eight states were part of the 1948 United States presidential election. Voters chose ten electors to the Electoral College, who voted for president and vice president.

Incumbent Democratic President Harry S. Truman won Oklahoma by a landslide 25.5 percentage points. This made Oklahoma the fourth most Democratic state in the nation, and 21 percent more Democratic than the nation as a whole. This makes it the third best performance (after Franklin D. Roosevelt's 1932 and 1936 landslides) of any Democratic nominee in the state. It was also the fourth and final election (after 1932, 1924 and 1920) that Oklahoma voted more Democratic than the nation at-large.

Up to this election, Oklahoma was a reliably Democratic state, with the party winning all but two of the first eleven presidential elections in the state. However, like other states in this Solid South, Oklahoma has since become a Republican bastion. In Dwight D. Eisenhower's landslide elections of 1952 and 1956, Adlai Stevenson II lost every antebellum free-soil or postbellum state, however Oklahoma remained more Democratic than the nation as a whole. In 1960, John F. Kennedy lost most postbellum states, including Oklahoma, due to anti-Catholic sentiment. In 1964, Lyndon Johnson became the last Democratic presidential candidate to carry the state, with only Jimmy Carter in 1976 subsequently reaching even 45% of the vote, and no Democrat after 2000 reaching 35% of the vote or even winning a single county in the state.

Truman won all but 10 counties in the state; of the 10, only Grant has voted Democratic since. This is the last occasion in which the contiguous counties of Texas, Beaver, Harper and Woods – which now form one of the most conservative regions in the nation – have voted Democratic, as well as the last time that Kay County has. As a result, this is also the last time that a Democrat has swept every county in the Oklahoma Panhandle. This is also the most recent election in which Oklahoma voted for a different candidate than neighboring Kansas.

Results

Results by county

See also
 United States presidential elections in Oklahoma

References

Oklahoma
1948
1948 Oklahoma elections